Marie de Nemours, originally known as Marie d'Orléans-Longueville (1625–1707), was Princess of Neuchâtel from 1694 to 1707. She was the daughter of Henri II d'Orléans, duc de Longueville and Louise de Bourbon. After the death of her brother Jean Louis Charles d'Orléans-Longueville in 1694 she succeeded him as sovereign Princess of Neuchâtel, although she remained a prominent member of the French royal court.

Biography
Descended from Jean d'Orléans, illegitimate son of Louis I, Duke of Orléans, she was known as Mademoiselle de Longueville prior to her marriage. 

By her marriage with Henri of Savoy, she became Duchess of Nemours. The couple were married on 22 May 1657 at Trie. The dukes of Nemours were descendants of the Dukes of Savoy having settled in France in the sixteenth century, where they ranked as princes étrangers.   
  
At an early age she was involved in the first Fronde, of which her father and stepmother, Anne Geneviève de Bourbon, were leaders. She married Henri II, Duke of Nemours in 1657. When he died in 1659, leaving her childless, the rest of her life was mainly spent in contesting her inheritance with her stepmother. Her Savoyard nieces included Marie Jeanne, Duchess of Savoy and Marie Françoise, Queen of Portugal.

The Dukes of Longueville had acquired the principality of Neuchâtel through marriage to Johanna of Hachberg-Sausenberg. After the death of her brother Jean-Louis-Charles d'Orléans in 1694, she succeeded him as Princess of Neuchâtel.

Legacy
She left some interesting memoirs, published by C. B. Petitot in the Collection complete des memoires (1819–1829).

She was the muse for Jean Loret's Muse historique (1650, 1660, 1665), a collection of weekly gazette burlesque reporting on the news of Paris society and the court of Louis XIV in the form of letters to Marie d'Orléans-Longueville which are considered an early example of French journalism.

Her childless death in 1707, without close relatives, opened a conflict about her vast inheritance. For example, see Duke of Estouteville.

Ancestry

References

External links

1625 births
1707 deaths
Princes of Neuchâtel
Counts of Dreux
Neuchatel, Princess of, Marie de Nemours
Marie
Nobility from Paris
French duchesses
17th-century French nobility
18th-century French nobility
18th-century women rulers
17th-century women rulers